This is a list of notable current and former faculty members, alumni, and non-graduating attendees of Carson–Newman University in Jefferson City, Tennessee.

Notable alumni 

 Dana X. Bible – American football, baseball and basketball coach and athletic administrator
 Millard F. Caldwell – 29th Governor of Florida, member of the U.S. Representative and Florida Supreme Court justice
 Michael Eric Dyson – author, Professor at Georgetown University
 Helen Timmons Henderson – educator, one of the first two women elected to the Virginia House of Delegates
 Ben W. Hooper – 28th Governor of Tennessee from 1911 to 1915
 Jennifer R. Mandel – biologist
 Chris Marion – member of classic rock band Little River Band
 T. B. Maston – Christian ethicist, writer, and professor
 Mary McDonald – musician and composer
 Bernie Moore – SEC commissioner, LSU track and field coach
 B. Carroll Reece – Member, US House of Representatives from Tennessee, 1921–1931 and 1933–1947
 Ken Sparks – Former C-N Football Coach, NCAA Hall of Fame Member
 Garnett S. Stokes – President of University of New Mexico
 John Q. Tilson – Member, US House of Representatives, 1909–1913 and 1915–1932; House Majority Leader 1925–1932
 Herbert S. Walters – United States Senator from Tennessee from 1963 to 1964
 Kenneth Massey – American sports statistician 
 John Wells – president of Emory and Henry College

Athletics alumni 
 Shonie Carter – professional mixed martial artist from 1997 to 2015 becoming the WEC Welterweight Champion and competed in the UFC
 Steve Cishek – Major League Baseball pitcher for the Washington Nationals
 Todd Collins – former National Football League football player and Super Bowl Champion with the St. Louis Rams
 Joe Fishback – former NFL football player & Super Bowl Champion with the Dallas Cowboys
 Tim George – former NFL wide receiver
 Boyce Green – former NFL player with the Cleveland Browns
 Robert Griswold - swimmer, Paralympic gold medalist
 Junior Glymph – former NFL football player
 Sylvia Hatchell – Head Women's Basketball Coach at UNC, 1986–2019
 Clayton Holmes – former NFL football player and Super Bowl Champion with the Dallas Cowboys
 Darren Hughes – former Arena Football League player
 Chris Jones – former Dallas Cowboys punter
 Cedric Killings – former NFL football player
 Pryor McElveen – former Major League Baseball third baseman for the Brooklyn Dodgers
 Lazaro Reinoso – wrestler, 1992 Olympic Bronze medalist, NCAA National Champion for C-N.
 Sanders Shiver – former NFL football player and Super Bowl Champion with the Baltimore Colts.
 Milas Shoun – former professional basketball player, 1927 to 1939
 Tracy Smothers - former professional wrestler 
 Anthony Toribio – former Kansas City Chiefs Defensive Tackle
 Vernon Turner – former NFL football player (Buffalo Bills, Los Angeles Rams, Detroit Lions, and Tampa Bay Buccaneers)
 Leonard Weaver – former NFL fullback
 Clyde Wright – former Major League Baseball pitcher

References

People
Lists of people by university or college in Tennessee